Pimsleur Language Programs is an American language learning company that develops and publishes courses based on the Pimsleur method. It is a division of Simon & Schuster, a publishing company which is a subsidiary of Paramount Global.  Pimsleur offers courses for 50 languages with English as the source language, and 14 ESL courses.

History
Dr. Paul Pimsleur, a professor and expert in applied linguistics and a founding member of the American Council on the Teaching of Foreign Languages (ACTFL),  wrote the original five courses:  Speak & Read Essential Greek (1963), Speak & Read Essential French (1964), Speak & Read Essential Spanish (1966), German Compact (1967), and Twi developed for the Peace Corps (1971).  The programs were originally called "A Tapeway Program".

Starting in 1969–1970, having tried unsuccessfully to market the programs, Pimsleur gave them to Charles A.S. and Beverly Heinle at The Center for Curriculum Development in Philadelphia. The courses were repackaged and marketed as "CCD/Tapeway Programs". In 1974, Charles Heinle bought the rights to Pimsleur and set up Heinle & Heinle Enterprises. In the 1980s, Heinle opened the Cassette Learning Centers, a stand in the Harvard Coop, in Cambridge, Massachusetts. Prospective users were invited to sit down and experience "The Pimsleur Tape". "The Pimsleur Tapes" were published by Heinle & Heinle Enterprises based in Concord, Massachusetts.

In 1983, Charles Heinle introduced SyberVision Systems founder Steven DeVore to the Pimsleur Russian program. DeVore, who had used a similar method to learn Finnish, exclusively licensed the Pimsleur programs. DeVore sold the programs in the SyberVision catalogs that were placed in the backseat pockets of major international air carriers and also mailed to 3 million SyberVision customers every month. SyberVision also produced and successfully sold Pimsleur programs via an infomercial that featured Beverly Pimsleur. SyberVision marketed the Pimsleur programs until 1997 before the license was sold to Simon & Schuster.

In 1995, Simon & Schuster took on distribution to bookstores.  Before Heinle & Heinle Enterprises sold Pimsleur to Simon & Schuster in 1997, they added 27 new languages to the Pimsleur catalog. Since the acquisition, Simon & Schuster Audio has added another 27 languages. Pimsleur's catalog currently stands at 59 languages and over 200 courses. The courses are still produced in Concord, Massachusetts and are available as digital audio downloads, CDs, and select languages are now available in interactive software format.

In 2005, digital editions of some languages were made available through various resellers.

In 2008, Pimsleur's first children's line, Speak Spanish with Dora & Diego, was released in coordination with Nickelodeon's Nick Jr.

In 2008, Playaway was licensed to distribute the entire Pimsleur line to the military on pre-loaded players.

In 2010, Pimsleur donated its Haitian Creole course for free to relief and charity workers after the devastating earthquake in Haiti.

In 2010, Pimsleur partnered with the USO, The Boston Foundation and Playaway to produce Pashto and Dari courses for U.S. troops serving in and being deployed to Afghanistan. This course is available for free to all military personnel.  Operation Speak Easy was funded by a Boston-area philanthropist and Pimsleur-enthusiast.

In 2010, Pimsleur Digital line was relaunched in DRM-free format and at a new low price.

In 2011, Pimsleur donated eight hours of its Japanese course to support aid agencies and volunteers in the wake of the tsunami disaster.

In 2012, Pimsleur released a new interactive software version of their Spanish, German, French, and Italian courses called Pimsleur Unlimited.

In 2013, Pimsleur celebrated its 50th anniversary with the launch of a new blog Pimsleur Speaks: On Language, Learning, and Culture.

In 2013, Pimsleur donated 15 lessons of its Tagalog course to support aid agencies and volunteers in the wake of Typhoon Haiyan.

In 2015, Pimsleur released three additional Unlimited languages (Mandarin, Portuguese, and Russian) in its interactive software format.

In 2016, Pimsleur made its Unlimited product line available as digital downloads worldwide.

In 2018, Pimsleur released its new Pimsleur app for iOS and Android devices and compatible with Amazon Echo devices. Pimsleur replaced the Unlimited product line with Pimsleur Premium available via in-app purchases or through their website.

In 2020, Pimsleur added bonus content to its Premium courses accessible via the Pimsleur web and mobile apps.

In the same year, Pimsleur started selling its courses via a subscription model on its website for the UK, the US, Canada and Australia. The subscription model is also available worldwide via in-app purchase in the Pimsleur mobile app.

In 2021, Pimsleur introduced an All Access subscription plan containing all 51 languages.

In 2022, Pimsleur offered its Ukrainian Premium course to support the humanitarian crisis in Ukraine.

In 2022, Pimsleur released Voice Coach, a voice recognition tool with instant feedback.

Course structure
Pimsleur courses are audio based with supplemental reading and study materials that accompany the recordings.  The audio lessons are generally 25 to 30 minutes in length.  Courses are generally divided into "Levels" comprising 30 lessons.  Some languages courses offer more levels than others, ranging from one to five levels.  French, for example, currently offers five levels, each comprising 30 lessons, for a total of 150 lessons and roughly 75 hours of total instruction.

Since the 2010s Pimsleur has expanded the number of levels available for certain languages.  Previously Pimsleur offered a maximum of 3 levels for their most comprehensively developed courses for a total of 90 lessons.  Some languages are now offered with up to 5 levels.  Prior to this expansion of course levels, a terminating "Plus" Level was offered for select languages.  These "Plus" levels contained 10 lessons which were published as additional material to be used by learners after completing Levels 1 to 3.  The "Plus" levels are now discontinued and considered out of print, although they remain available for sale on the used market and in some public libraries.

Some languages offered by Pimsleur contain fewer than the standard 30 lessons in a level.  Pimsleur also offers beginner courses and truncated courses under the series titles: "Basic" "Instant Conversation", or "go".

Lesson structure 
Each 25-30 minute lesson begins with a brief conversation in the target language.  An English speaking instructor then presents the conversation (or the relevant new material after the first lesson) in English.  The new material is then presented gradually within the context previous taught words and phrases. Long words or phrases may be repeated using back-chaining, where the instructor repeats the end, tacks on the preceding portions, and eventually says says the entire phrase as the learner repeats. The lessons often conclude with a brief conversation in the target language to review the new material covered in the lesson.  Learners are instructed to continue to the next lesson the following day if they feel they have reached 80% proficiency with the material covered.

Course content
The most comprehensively developed Pimsleur Language Programs (those with three or more levels) cover a wide range of material relevant to learners traveling or living in a place where the target language is spoken: 
 Courtesies
 Verification of understanding
 Travel essentials
 Communication
 Use of formal & informal address
 Directions & locations
 Transportation
 Numbers & counting
 Food & drink
 Time & date
 Money
 Work & Business
 Leisure & sport
 Family life
 Education
 Personal health
 Weather & temperature
 Cities, states, & countries

Learners who complete a course with 3-5 levels should expect to be presented with 1500-2500 vocabulary words.

Course updates
Some Pimsleur courses have been occasionally updated to reflect cultural and societal changes, such as changes in currency.

Languages
Pimsleur Language Programs offers courses for 50 different languages other than English.  14 ESL courses are offered.

Corporate structure
Pimsleur Language Programs is owned by Simon & Schuster Audio, a division of Simon & Schuster, which is part of Paramount Global.

Offices
Corporate headquarters are in New York, New York.
Editorial offices are in Concord, Massachusetts. All courses are developed, produced, and recorded at this location.

See also
Audiofy bookchip
Language education
List of language self-study programs

References

External links
 Official website
 Pimsleur Android App
 Pimsleur iOS App

Learning methods
Language education materials
Language acquisition
Proprietary language learning software
American companies established in 1963
Simon & Schuster
Publishing companies of the United States
Companies based in Middlesex County, Massachusetts
1963 establishments in Massachusetts
Android (operating system) software